Kinks-Size is a studio album by the English rock band the Kinks, released as their second album in the United States. It was issued by Reprise Records in March1965 in both mono and simulated stereo formats. It peaked at number 13 on the Billboard album chart in the third week of June1965, the same week the Kinks began their first US tour. It is the Kinks' fourth-highest charting album on the Billboard album chart and the second-highest of their 1960s albums. The album ranked number 78 on Billboard year-end album chart for 1965.

Reprise issued the album to capitalise on the nation-wide publicity generated by the band's February1965 appearance on the musical variety programme Hullabaloo. The album had no direct analogue outside of the US market, but instead collected songs from the UK EP Kinksize Session, two songs which had been left off of the US version of the band's debut LP and both the A- and B-sides of the "All Day and All of the Night" and "Tired of Waiting for You" singles. All of its songs were recorded at Pye Studios in London, between August and December1964, though Dave Davies also overdubbed an electric guitar contribution to "Tired of Waiting for You" at IBC Studios in London.

Reception

The album has been critiqued as a clear cash-grab by Reprise, but the actual songs included have been praised as "the best parts of the group's work in England", with Bruce Eder of AllMusic writing, "this record rocks, showing off the better sides of the group's R&B output and early, formative, Beatles-influenced experiments as well."

Track listing
All songs written by Ray Davies unless otherwise noted.

Side one
"Tired of Waiting for You"2:30
"Louie Louie" (Richard Berry)2:57
"I've Got that Feeling"2:45
"Revenge" (Davies, Larry Page)1:28
"I Gotta Move"2:24

Side two
"Things are Getting Better"1:57
"I Gotta Go Now"2:54
"I'm a Lover Not a Fighter" (J.D. Miller)2:20
"Come on Now"1:45
"All Day and All of the Night"2:02

Personnel 
According to band researcher Doug Hinman:

The Kinks
Ray Davieslead vocals, rhythm guitar, harmonica; piano ; lead guitar 
Dave Daviesbacking vocals, lead guitar; lead vocals 
Pete Quaifebacking vocals, bass guitar
Mick Avorydrums; tambourine 

Additional musicians
Perry Fordpiano 
Bobby Grahamdrums 
Johnny B. Great backing vocals 
Nicky Hopkinspiano 
Jimmy Pagetwelve-string acoustic guitar 

Production
Bob Augerengineer
Shel Talmyproducer

Charts

Notes

References

Sources 

 
 
 

The Kinks compilation albums
1965 albums
Albums produced by Shel Talmy
Reprise Records compilation albums